Artur Olegovich Parfenchikov (born November 29, 1964) is a Russian politician who since February 2017, has been serving as the Head of the Republic of Karelia, a federal subject of Russia. Parfenchikov was appointed to the post of acting governor after Aleksandr Hudilainen resigned in 2017. He was later confirmed in the position in a general election, where he was a candidate representing the ruling United Russia party. Prior to his appointment as governor, Parfenchikov was the head of the Federal Court Bailiff Service.

References

United Russia politicians
21st-century Russian politicians
People from Petrozavodsk
1964 births
Living people
Heads of the Republic of Karelia